Sir Ralph Eure (or Evers) was a military administrator and Member of Parliament.

He was the son of William Eure, 1st Baron Eure of Witton, County Durham and Elizabeth, the daughter of Sir Christopher Willoughby of Parham, Suffolk.

He was deputy constable of Scarborough Castle from 1531, being in charge during the Pilgrimage of Grace and promoted constable in 1537. He was knighted in 1536 and returned as Member of Parliament for Scarborough from 1542 to 1544.

In 1542 he was appointed a deputy warden of the Middle Marches and promoted warden from 1544 during the period of conflict between England and Scotland known as the Rough Wooing. During that time he undertook several raids into Scotland. A Respite was made to William Lauder, Burgess of Lauder, and William Lauder, his son, for their treasonable supplying and assistance given to Sir Rauff Everis and other Englishmen before his decease, whilst invading this realm with fire and sword. The respite was for all action and crime (etc); and for all other actions, crimes, etc., including treason, and bound over to observe their good conduct for 11 years. Dated at Edinburgh, 20 May 1546.

He was killed in the Scottish victory at the Battle of Ancrum Moor on 27 February 1545.

Eure had married by 1529, Margery, the daughter of Sir Ralph Bowes of Streatlam, county Durham, with whom he had three sons and two daughters. On his untimely death his offices passed to his father; the baronetcy eventually passed in 1548 to his son William.

References

1545 deaths
Year of birth unknown
Knights Bachelor
16th-century English soldiers
English people of the Rough Wooing
English MPs 1542–1544
Eure family